The 1999 Trans America Athletic Conference men's basketball tournament (now known as the Atlantic Sun men's basketball tournament) was held February 25–27 at the Jacksonville Coliseum in Jacksonville, Florida.

Top-seeded  defeated  in the championship game, 89–61, to win their first TAAC/Atlantic Sun men's basketball tournament.

The Bulldogs, therefore, received the TAAC's automatic bid to the 1999 NCAA tournament, their first Division I tournament appearance.

Format
College of Charleston and Florida International departed the TAAC prior the season while Jacksonville was added; total membership decreased from twelve to eleven. 

While the regular season division structure was ended, it was continued that only the top eight teams from the conference standings qualified for the tournament field.

Bracket

References

ASUN men's basketball tournament
Tournament
TAAC men's basketball tournament
TAAC men's basketball tournament